Autumn Moon Over the Calm Lake (pinyin: Píng Hú Qiū Yuè) is a Cantonese piece that was written by Lü Wencheng in the 1930s and is considered his most representative piece.  He composed the music on a visit to the famous West Lake in Hangzhou, and is a sublime expression of his veneration for the beauty and grace of the scenery.  The West Lake has been considered since the ancient times as a gorgeous place of  tranquility, and the music illustrates the atmosphere and feel of the place with placid suppleness. In this piece, which is one of his most famous, Lü combined elements of Zhejiang silk-and-bamboo music with Cantonese music.  A piano transcription by Chen Peixun is a part of the repertoire of many Chinese pianists.

Audio sample
 Performance of Autumn Moon Over Calm Lake by Jiyang Chen

References
Du, Yaxiong. Traditional Music Composers, article in Encyclopedia of Contemporary Chinese Culture p. 843, edited by Edward L Davis, Routledge 2005.

External links
Performance Video Di Xiao
Lü Wencheng and Guangdong Music
Autumn Moon over the Calm Lake a fix location and one of the top ten attractions at West Lake

Cantonese music
1930s songs